Inny Junction was a former station on the Dublin-Sligo railway line. It opened in 1869 and closed in 1941. 
For the last decade it solely served as a staff halt. The MGWR branch to Cavan, which closed in 1960, diverged here. The station was located in a very isolated rural location.

References

Ordnance Survey of Ireland 1: 50,000 Discovery Series map no. 41 shows the station locale.

List: I
Railway stations opened in 1869
1869 establishments in Ireland
Railway stations in the Republic of Ireland opened in the 19th century